Exaeretia liupanshana is a moth in the family Depressariidae. It is found in China (Ningxia).

References

Moths described in 2010
Exaeretia
Moths of Asia